Teresa Chipia is an Angolan politician.

Chipia is a member of the National Assembly of Angola. Chipia was elected in 2017.

Chipia is in the National Union for the Total Independence of Angola.

Chipia was a provincial president of the Liga da Mulher Angolana (LIMA) ("Angolan Women's League") from 1992 to 1995.

References

Living people
21st-century women politicians
Members of the National Assembly (Angola)
UNITA politicians
Year of birth missing (living people)